The Danube delta gudgeon (Romanogobio antipai) was a species of cyprinid fish endemic to the lower Danube in Romania and the Ukraine. It was last recorded in the 1960s, with many studies conducted in its home range, all failing to find the species.

Named in memory of Romanian zoologist Grigore Antipa (1867-1944), who collected the type specimen.

References

Romanogobio
Fish described in 1953
Taxa named by Petre Mihai Bănărescu